This article list all the confirmed broadcasters for the UEFA Europa League with each broadcaster holding three season broadcasting rights. The current cycle will be from 2021–2024.

Current broadcasters

2021–2024 seasons

2024–2027 seasons

References

broadcasters
Lists of sporting event broadcasters